A by-election for the seat of St Leonards in the New South Wales Legislative Assembly was held on 4 June 1885 because of the death of Bernhardt Holtermann.

Dates

Candidates

 John Hurley was a mining speculator who had previously been a member of the Legislative Assembly and who had returned from Queensland, having been a member of the Queensland Legislative Assembly until July 1884.

 Isaac Ives was a former Mayor of Victoria, which covered the suburb of North Sydney.

 Michael McMahon was the Mayor of Victoria and a wealthy businessman, with a mansion on McMahons Point which was named after him.

Results

Bernhardt Holtermann died.

See also
Electoral results for the district of St Leonards
List of New South Wales state by-elections

References

1885 elections in Australia
New South Wales state by-elections
1880s in New South Wales